McVince Alleza "Vince" Rooi (born December 13, 1981 in Amsterdam) is a Dutch former baseball player who played professionally from 1999 to 2018. He also played on the Dutch national team in the 2009 World Baseball Classic.

Baseball career
In , Rooi signed with the Amsterdam Pirates.

External links
The Baseball Cube
MiLB.com

References

1981 births
2009 World Baseball Classic players
Brevard County Manatees players
Clinton LumberKings players
Dutch expatriate baseball players in the United States
Harrisburg Senators players
Living people
Lynchburg Hillcats players
Potomac Nationals players
Sportspeople from Amsterdam
Vermont Expos players